The 1937–38 Coppa Italia was the 3rd edition of the tournament under the organization of the Higher Directory. The competition was won by Juventus.

The final resulting the Turin derby, and both teams having their own stadium, a two-legged final was decided.

Qualifying round
Serie C qualifying and preliminary rounds were under geographical zones.

Replay match

1st preliminary round
46 clubs are added.

Replay matches

2nd Preliminary Round
Vigevano from Serie B are added.

3rd Preliminary Round 
16 Serie B clubs are added (Venezia, Anconitana, Messina, Brescia, Modena, Novara, Pisa, Pro Vercelli, Alessandria, Taranto, Padova, Spezia, Sanremese, Palermo, Cremonese, Hellas Verona).

Replay match

First Round
16 Serie A clubs are added (Triestina, Ambrosiana-Inter, Bari, Atalanta, Livorno, Bologna, Juventus, Lazio, Liguria, Fiorentina, Roma, Genova 1893, Lucchese, Torino, Napoli, Milano).

Replay matches

Second round 

Replay matches

Quarter-finals

Semi-finals 

Replay match

Final

First leg

Second leg 
Juventus won 5–2 on aggregate.

Top goalscorers

References 

rsssf.com

Coppa Italia seasons
Coppa Italia
Italia